Quadrosilan (brand name Cisobitan; former developmental code name KABI-1774) is a synthetic nonsteroidal estrogen that was developed in the 1970s and that is or has been used as an antigonadotropic agent in the treatment of prostate cancer. It is an organosilicon compound, and is also known as 2,6-cisdiphenylhexamethylcyclotetrasiloxane. Quadrosilan has estrogenic activity equivalent to that of estradiol, and can produce feminization and gynecomastia as side effects in male patients.

See also
 Paroxypropione
 Metallibure

References

Abandoned drugs
Antigonadotropins
Hormonal antineoplastic drugs
Siloxanes
Synthetic estrogens